Reich der Träume (German, "Realm of Dreams") is an unofficial release of obscure Nico tracks. It was  released by Faust Records in 2002. Another, similar CD compilation from the same originators, Walpurgis-Nacht, was released shortly after.

Track listing
 "Reich der Träume (Land of Dreams)" (remix)
 "All Tomorrow's Parties" (band version)
 "Lied vom Einsamen Mädchen" (live)
 "Femme Fatale" (live)
 "60/40" (live)
 "My Funny Valentine" (live)
 "Win a Few" (live)
 "Saeta" (live)
 "Fearfully in Danger" (live)
 "We've Got the Gold" (live)
 "Mütterlein" (live)
 "Afraid" (live)
 "Your Voice"" (demo)
 "Sound" (demo version)
 "Orly Flight" (live)
 "Saeta"

References 

Nico albums
2002 compilation albums